This is a summary of 1917 in music in the United Kingdom.

Events
January – Morfydd Llwyn Owen makes her professional debut at London's Aeolian Hall.
Summer – Composer Arnold Bax and his lover, pianist Harriet Cohen, holiday together in Cornwall.
26 November – After several cancellations, Granville Bantock's Tone Poem No. 3, also known as Orchestral Drama: Fifine at the Fair is finally performed by the Royal Philharmonic Society, conducted by Sir Thomas Beecham. 
date unknown – Under the direction of Rupert D'Oyly Carte, the D'Oyly Carte Opera Company makes the first complete recording of a Gilbert and Sullivan opera, The Mikado, for the Gramophone Company (later His Master's Voice).

Popular music
Edward Elgar and Rudyard Kipling – "The Lowestoft Boat"
Bert Lee and R. P. Weston – "Paddy McGinty's Goat"

Classical music: new works
Kenneth J. Alford
On the Quarter Deck, march
The Middy, march
The Voice of the Guns
Arnold Bax – November Woods
Frank Bridge – Cello Sonata in D minor
Rebecca Clarke – Morpheus
Frederick Delius – Eventyr (Once Upon a Time)
Edward Elgar
The Sanguine Fan (ballet)
The Spirit of England
Gustav Holst – The Hymn of Jesus
Charles Villiers Stanford
Aviator's Hymn, for tenor, bass, choir, and organ
Irish Rhapsody No. 5, in G Minor, for orchestra
Night Thoughts, Op. 148, for piano
"On Windy Way When Morning Breaks", partsong
Sailing Song, partsong, two soprano voices
"St George of England", song
Scènes de ballet, Op. 150, for piano
Sonata No. 1, in F major, Op. 149, for organ
Sonata No. 2 ("Eroica"), in G minor, Op. 151, for organ
Sonata No. 3 ("Britannica"), in D minor, Op. 152, for organ

Musical theatre
10 February – The Maid of the Mountains by Seymour Hicks, with music by Sidney Jones and Paul Rubens, and lyrics by Adrian Ross, starring José Collins, by Harold Fraser-Simson, with additional music by James W. Tate, lyrics by Harry Graham and additional lyrics by Frank Clifford Harris and Valentine, opens at Daly's Theatre, where it runs for 1,352 performances.
14 September – The Boy, by Fred Thompson and Percy Greenbank, with music by Lionel Monckton and Howard Talbot and lyrics by Greenbank and Adrian Ross, opens at the Adelphi Theatre for a run of 801 performances, starring Maisie Gay and Donald Calthrop.

Births
25 February – Anthony Burgess, composer and writer (died 1993)
27 February – George Mitchell, founder of the Black and White Minstrels (died 2002)
2 March – John Gardner, composer (died 2011)
20 March – Vera Lynn, singer (died 2020) 
23 March – Josef Locke, tenor (died 1999)
29 June – Mary Berry, canoness, choral conductor and musicologist (died 2008)
15 September – Richard Arnell, composer (died 2009)

Deaths
25 February – Paul Rubens, composer and songwriter, 41 (tuberculosis) 
7 August – Basil Hood, librettist and lyricist, 53 
11 September – Evie Greene, actress and singer, 42 (Bright's disease)

See also
 1917 in the United Kingdom

References

British Music, 1917 in
Music
British music by year
1910s in British music